"Awake in a Dream" was the debut single released by Canadian singer-songwriter Kalan Porter. It was written by Rupert Gayle, Adam Alexander, and Chris Perry as the coronation song for the winner of the second season of Canadian Idol. Porter and runner-up Theresa Sokyrka each performed "Awake in a Dream" on the show and recorded a studio version in the event they won. The song later appeared on Porter's 2004 debut studio album, 219 Days. 

The single was released on October 5, 2004 in Canada, where it became the fastest-selling 2004 release. It debuted at number one on the Canadian Singles Chart, where it stayed for eight weeks. It became the biggest-selling debut single by a Canadian artist. "Awake in a Dream" was certified 8× Platinum by Music Canada (formerly the Canadian Recording Industry Association) in November 2004 for sales of over 80,000 units.

Track listing 
"Awake in a Dream"
"Awake in a Dream (Instrumental Version)"

Charts

Certifications

References 

2004 singles
Canadian Singles Chart number-one singles
Canadian pop songs
2004 songs
Songs written by Rupert Gayle
ViK. Recordings singles